Thomas Elisha Hogg (June 19, 1842 – September 1880) was an American teacher, lawyer, editor and writer, brother of James Stephen Hogg, Governor of Texas, and uncle of Ima Hogg. Ima was named from an epic Civil War poem, The Fate of Marvin, that Thomas Hogg had written.  He used the pseudonym Tom R. Burnett.

References

External links
Thomas Hogg in the Handbook of Texas

Further reading
 C. A. Bridges, History of Denton, Texas, from Its Beginning to 1960 (Waco: Texian Press, 1978). 
 Robert C. Cotner, James Stephen Hogg: A Biography (Austin: University of Texas Press, 1959). 
 Dallas Times Herald, February 23, 1878. 
 Denton Record-Chronicle, August 2, 1953. 
 Hattie Joplin Roach, A History of Cherokee County (Dallas: Southwest, 1934).

People from Cherokee County, Texas
1842 births
1880 deaths
Writers from Texas
American people of Scottish descent